Cracker Gothic is a style of historical homes in Florida that are otherwise considered under the Florida cracker architecture style. Cracker Gothic comes from Florida cracker and Gothic Revival architecture and can be used interchangeably with Southern Gothic.

Architectural Definition

Theatrical Definition

References 

Florida cracker culture
Gothic Revival architecture in Florida